Kizil-Koba is a Middle Paleolithic culture belonging to a people who lived in the 9th–8th millennia BC in the Eastern Crimean territory and ancestral to Tauri. It is known as the first Eastern European settlement, where Neanderthal remains were found. The Kizil-Koba culture is represented by the materials from two caves: the Kizil-Koba cave and Prolom I. Both settlements are located in the foothills of the Crimean Mountains in the East Crimea.

The similarity between the Kizil-Koba culture and the Koban culture created by the Cimmerian tribes in the Caucasus leads to suppose that the Kizil-Koba culture emerged in the Caucasus.

Kizil-Koba Cave

Name 

Kizil-Koba (The Krasnaya Cave -literally translates as the Red Cave) is the biggest grotto of the Crimea and one of the karst cave that appear on the limestone in Eastern Europe. The cave is known as the "Kiikin-Kobasy" (Savage's Cave) by local Tatars or “Kiik-Koba” (Wild Cave) chosen by the archeologist Bonch-Osmolowski.

Geography 
Kizil-Koba is located on the right bank of the Zuya River, 7 km south of Zuya city, 20 km south-west of Belogorsk district, 25 km east of Simferopol in the Salgir river system. The cave belongs to the South foothill valley-cuesta region with 44 º 58” Northern Latitude and 34 º 20” Eastern Longitude. The cave located 150 m over the river level has a depth of 9 m, length of 9 m and width of 11 m.

History 
Kizil Koba cave was discovered by G. A. Bonch-Osmolovsky in 1924 and investigated over 2 years by him along with N. L. Ernst, S.A. Trusova, E.V.Zhirov and others. G. A. Bonch-Osmolovsky published monographs and articles about the results of cave materials and excavations in 1934, 1940, 1941, 1954.

Finding the Kizil-Koba created the conditions for the discovery of the new Paleolithic settlements in Crimea and extensive study of the Quaternary period.

Cultural remainings 
A large number of ceramic artefacts, including bronze arrow heads, choker, bracelets and rings dating back to the 7th to 6th centuries B.C. were found by N. L. Ernst and G. A. Bonch-Osmolovsky.

Bonch-Osmolovsky identified 7 layers in Kiik Koba cave and labeled them I-VII from the top to the bottom. These layers reflect 2 separate Middle Paleolithic occupation – Upper MP occupation (layers II-IV) and Lower MP occupation (layers V-VI). 12874 lithics were revealed from the lower occupation, 4.755 from the upper occupation. In layer IIa, Mesolithic remains were found (50 pieces).

Two Neanderthal interments (an adult and a child) were uncovered in 1924 from Kizil-Koba cave. They were identified as Kiik-Koba 1 (adult) and Kiik-Koba 2 (child). Kiik-koba 1 buried in limestone soil was found in layer VI. 73 skeletal remains belonging to the 40–45 years old adult have been found and they date about 35,000 years ago. Findings consist of canine, hand fragments, foot remains, right patella, tibia and fibula. The height of this person estimated to be nearly 164 cm and weight to be 78 kg. The gender of this Neandertal is controversial, as some scholars (Alexeev) assumed that it was female, however, according to the tibial maximum and body proportions of Neandertals, it is presumed that the skeleton belonged to a man.

Kizil-Koba 2 – the more intact skeleton was discovered close to the adult's remains in a separate grave and considered to be belong to an infant (younger than 12 months old at death).

In the upper occupation of Kizil Koba remains of different animals were detected. According to the faunistic data, people mainly (65.5%) hunted horse, saiga and giant deer. 8 species (ass, bison, mammoth, ram, wild boar, red deer, bear, woolly rhinoceros) were constituted the remaining part (34.5%). (1) Based on the pollen spectra, it is believed that Upper layer had larger areas covered with trees (pine, oak, hazel, birch) than Lower layer. Some of other tree species (maple, juniper and buckthorn) were determined from the charcoal relics.

Prolom I 
The materials found in the Prolom I cave are similar to the Kilik-Koba findings. The lithic industry characteristic to the upper layer of Kilik-Koba and two layers of Prolom I is called as “Para-Micoquien”.

The Prolom I cave was explored by Yu. G. Kolosov in 1973. The Prolom I cave is located on the left side of the river Kuchuk Karasu Valley, 10 km north-east of Belogorsk district, in the Salgir river system with 45º07” Northern Latitude, 34 º42” Eastern Longitude. 7 lithological layers were identified here. Generally, the set of layers were divided into 2 parts: Upper layer with significant limestone remains and Lower layer composed of nummulithic sand having a small amount of remains.

The cave is covered with limestone in the south-eastern part dating back to the Middle Eocene age. The cave has 2 caverns. The larger one is 4 m high, 5 m long and 7 m wide, while the other has 1.5 m height, 5 m length and 2.5 m width. The cave has 12 m height.

See also 

 History of Crimea
 List of caves

References 

Koban culture
Ancient Crimea